Blabioides is a monotypic moth genus in the subfamily Arctiinae erected by George Hampson in 1900. Its only species, Blabioides snelleni, was first described by Ritsema in 1900. It is found on Java in Indonesia.

References

Lithosiini
Monotypic moth genera
Moths of Indonesia